Athens "Liosion" Bus Station also known as KTEL Liosion Bus Station is the second busiest bus station in Athens. It is located in Patisia in Athens Municipality. There are routes to Central Greece, Thessaly, Pieria. There are a lot of passengers that use the Bus Station and it is the second largest bus station in Athens after Athens Kifissos Bus Station. 5 million passengers travel to Central Greece and Thessaly via this bus station. The busiest route is to Chalkida. There are routes per 30 minutes. There are new plans to build a bus station in Elaionas, Athens that will serve all routes of the entire nation. The new Bus Station will open in 2025.

Destinations

Ground Transport 
There is an Athens Metro station close to the bus station, known as Kato Patisia in Line 1. There are a lot of taxis outside the terminal. Also there are a lot of bus routes that connect Athens city centre to the bus station, as well as a line that connects the airport with the Kifisos bus terminal which is the bus terminal for Peloponnese, Macedonia, Epirus, Thrace and the Ionian islands. X93 connects the Bus Terminal with Athens International Airport.

References

Bus stations in Greece
Transport in Athens
Buildings and structures in Athens